Flavien is a French masculine given name that may refer to the following notable people:
Flavien Belson (born 1987), French football midfielder
Flavien-Guillaume Bouthillier (1844–1907), Canadian lawyer and political figure
Flavien Enzo Boyomo (born 2001), French football player
Flavien Conne (born 1980), Swiss ice hockey player
Flavien Dassonville (born 1991), French cyclist
Flavien Dupont (1847–1898), Canadian notary and political figure 
Flavien Khoury (1859–1920), Archbishop of the Melkite Greek Catholic Archeparchy of Homs in Syria
Flavien Maurelet (born 1991), French cyclist
Flavien Michelini (born 1986), French football midfielder
Flavien Le Postollec (born 1984), Ivorian-Breton football midfielder
Flavien Prat (born 1992), French jockey
Flavien Ranaivo (1914–1999), Malagasy poet and journalist
Flavien Tait (born 1993), French footballer midfielder
Pierre-Flavien Turgeon (1787–1867), Canadian Roman Catholic priest and Archbishop

French masculine given names